Colonel RSN Singh (Ravi Shekhar Narayan Singh) is an Indian defence expert and a former Research and Analysis Wing (R&AW) officer and also Indian Army officer. He has written several books and has given talks on geopolitical defense and strategic issues, particularly from an Indian perspective.

References

Living people
Indian writers
Year of birth missing (living people)
Indian civil servants
Orphaned articles from November 2020